The John Hart Whorton House is located in Appleton, Wisconsin, United States. It was added to the National Register of Historic Places in 1974.

History
The original owner of the house was John Hart Whorton. Whorton was a prominent businessman and banker in Appleton, where he was also active in the Republican Party and the local Methodist church. As of 2010, the house was owned by a retired Lawrence University professor.

References

Buildings and structures in Appleton, Wisconsin
Houses in Outagamie County, Wisconsin
Houses on the National Register of Historic Places in Wisconsin
Italianate architecture in Wisconsin
National Register of Historic Places in Outagamie County, Wisconsin